Muhammad Rafiq Tarar (2 November 1929 – 7 March 2022) was a Pakistani politician and jurist who served as the ninth president of Pakistan from January 1998 until his resignation in June 2001, and prior to that as a senator from Punjab in 1997. Before entering politics, Tarar served as senior justice of the Supreme Court of Pakistan from 1991 to 1994 and as the 28th Chief Justice of Lahore High Court from 1989 to 1991.

Tarar was born in Mandi Bahauddin, and graduated with LLB from University of the Punjab in 1951, before starting practice as a lawyer in Lahore High Court the following year. In 1966, he pursued a career as a jurist. Tarar later served as a justice in Pakistan's highest courts. After his retirement at 65, he started a political career as a legal advisor to Nawaz Sharif. Tarar became a senator from Punjab in 1997 and the same year nominated as presidential candidate by PML-N, but his nomination paper was rejected by the Acting Chief Election Commissioner. Barrister Ijaz Husain Batalvi assisted by M. A. Zafar and Akhtar Aly Kureshy Advocate, challenged his rejection in Lahore High Court and the Full Bench set aside the rejection order of Election Commission and he was elected as President of Pakistan in the presidential election by a margin of 374 out of 457 votes of the Electoral College.

Tarar assumed office in January 1998 with heavy criticism by opposition especially from former Prime Minister Benazir Bhutto who accused him of illegally legitimizing dismissal of his government as a judge of Supreme Court of Pakistan. As a head of state, Tarar shifted Pakistan's system of government from semi-presidential system to parliamentary democratic system by signing Thirteenth Constitutional Amendment. He surrendered his reserve power of dismissing Prime Minister, triggering new elections and dissolving National Assembly. He also signed the Fourteenth and Fifteenth amendment to the constitution that limited the powers of the presidency from executive to a figurehead.

Tarar resigned as President in 2001 in the wake of the 1999 Pakistani coup d'état. He resisted and did not endorse the 12 October 1999 military coup. He was forced to step down by then Chief Executive Pervez Musharraf and ultimately succeeded by Musharraf through a referendum held in 2002. Twenty months after seizing power in a coup, General Musharraf took the head of state's oath and became the fourth military ruler to become president.

Early life and education
Muhammad Rafiq Tarar was born in Mandi Bahauddin, British India, on 2 November 1929 to a Tarar family. Tarar was influenced by Syed Ata Ullah Shah Bukhari and he took a part in political sessions of Majlis-e-Ahrar-e-Islam during British colonial rule. In his college years, he was also an activist for the All-India Muslim League and was a follower of Muhammad Ali Jinnah. During the partition of India, Tarar performed voluntary duty as a relief worker in camps set up by the All India Muslim Students Federation for Indian emigrants. He graduated with BA in Islamic Studies from Government Islamia College, Gujranwala in 1949. He acquired LLB degree in 1951 from Punjab Law College, University of the Punjab.

Judicial and political career
Tarar started a career as a lawyer, soon after completion of his studies. In 1951, he enrolled as a Pleader in Lahore High Court. He started practicing as an Advocate in the same court, in later years. He established a Gujranwala-based legal aid firm in 1960s and excelled at advocacy. In 1966, Tarar started a judicial career after he appeared and passed the competitive exams to be elevated as session judge in District Courts. In 1971, he became Chairman of the Punjab Labor Court. Tarar was appointed a judge at Lahore High Court, highest appellate judicial court of Punjab province, in October 1974.

Tarar served in the Lahore High Court as a justice for decades. He was also a member of the Election Commission of Pakistan where he represented Punjab. He was appointed the 28th Chief Justice of Lahore High Court where he served from 1989 to 1991 until his appointment as a judge in the Supreme Court of Pakistan. His appointment was made by then president Ghulam Ishaq Khan with the consent of Supreme Judicial Council. He served as a senior justice of the Supreme Court of Pakistan from January 1991 to November 1994. He was also an awaiting candidate of the Chief Justice of Pakistan but he retired earlier on attaining the age of 65 years and started a political career. In 1994, following his retirement from judiciary, Tarar entered in to politics and started a political career as a legal adviser and close aide to then opposition leader Nawaz Sharif. In March 1997, he became a senator and represented Punjab in the upper-house of Pakistan until his resignation in December 1997. He was nominated as presidential candidate by PML(N) same year and secured a historical victory in presidential election.

Presidency (1998–2001)

Initial days
After Farooq Leghari's resignation in 1997, he was nominated as a candidate for the President of Pakistan. On 31 December 1997, in an indirect election, Tarar was elected by a huge margin, getting 374 of 457 votes of the Electoral College against Aftab Mirani of PPP (a PML(N)'s rival) who got 31 votes, and Muhammad Khan Shirani of JUI(S) who got 22 votes. This was the largest margin in such elections. On his appointment former Prime Minister Benazir Bhutto delivered a speech in London to the Commonwealth Ethnic Bar Association and criticized his appointment. She accused him of being dishonest by saying "A former judge [Tarar] who dishonestly legitimized the overthrow of my first government was elected President of Pakistan. This same man stands accused by a former President Farooq Leghari of "taking briefcases of money" to bribe other judges in the famous 1997 case. The Election Commission rejected Justice Tarar's nomination for the presidency. Justice Qayyum, on leave for his mother's funeral, rushed back to grant a stay. And Tarar was elected. As for the bribery charges, Tarar, as a former judge, like former generals, is immune to prosecution in real terms."

Constitutional reforms
Upon becoming President, Tarar was an unassuming and merely ceremonial figurehead who kept a low profile, and avoided news media, and he remained a devoted servant and loyalist of the Sharif family. He readily signed the Thirteenth, Fourteenth, and Fifteenth amendments to the Constitution of Pakistan that limited the powers of the presidency.

The President of Pakistan's powers had thus been slowly removed over the years, culminating in the 1997 Thirteenth Amendment to the Constitution of Pakistan which removed virtually all remaining reserve powers, making the office almost entirely symbolic in nature as per the true spirit of the Pakistani constitution.

Resignation
Tarar did not endorse the 1999 Pakistani coup d'état by the Pakistani military which elevated General Pervez Musharraf, Chairman Joint Chiefs of Staff Committee, since he was an appointee of the Nawaz Sharif. The Pakistani military thus decided not to retain Tarar as the President for his full term of five years, given his partisan attitude. On 21 June 2001, General Musharraf who acted as Chief Executive in capacity, enforced the Legal Framework Order, 2002; Musharraf removed Tarar as he read the paragraph: "Mr. Muhammad Rafiq Tarar has ceased to hold the office of the President with immediate effect."

Death
Tarar retired from politics and settled in Lahore, where he died after a long illness on 7 March 2022, at the age of 92.'

References

Citations

Cited works and general bibliography 

 
 
 
 

|-

1929 births
2022 deaths
Chief Justices of the Lahore High Court
Deaths from coronary artery disease
Justices of the Supreme Court of Pakistan
Members of the Senate of Pakistan
Pakistan Movement activists
Pakistan Muslim League (N) politicians
Pakistani democracy activists
Pakistani judges
Pakistani jurists
Pakistani Muslims
People from Gujranwala
Presidents of Pakistan
Punjabi people
University of the Punjab alumni